Prof. Buta Singh Sidhu is an Indian educational administrator. He is vice-chancellor of Maharaja Ranjit Singh Punjab Technical University, BATHINDA. He has also served as Dean Academic for a long time in I.K. Gujral Punjab Technical University from March 2010 to October 2016.

References

Living people
Academic staff of Maharaja Ranjit Singh Punjab Technical University
Year of birth missing (living people)
Academic staff of I. K. Gujral Punjab Technical University